Mukim Liang is a mukim in Belait District, Brunei. The population was 14,301 in 2016.

Geography 
The mukim is located in the north of the district, bordering the South China Sea to the north, Mukim Telisai in Tutong District to the north-east, Mukim Bukit Sawat to the south-east, Mukim Labi to the south and Mukim Seria to the west.

Demographics 
As of 2016 census, the population was 14,301 with  males and  females. The mukim had 2,607 households occupying 2,602 dwellings. Among the population,  lived in urban areas, while the remainder of  lived in rural areas.

Villages 
As of 2016, the mukim comprised the following census villages:

The villages above are currently grouped into three areas and each is overseen by a village head. The areas include:
 Kampong Lumut I
 Kampong Lumut II
 Kampong Sungai Liang

References 

Liang
Belait District